Jakub Apolinarski (born 4 May 1999) is a Polish footballer who plays as a right winger for Pogoń Grodzisk Mazowiecki.

Club career

In 2019, he signed for Raków Częstochowa.

On 23 September 2020, he joined GKS Jastrzębie on a season-long loan.

References

External links

1999 births
People from Leszno
Sportspeople from Greater Poland Voivodeship
Living people
Polish footballers
Poland youth international footballers
Association football midfielders
Raków Częstochowa players
Polonia Środa Wielkopolska players
Warta Poznań players
GKS Jastrzębie players
Ekstraklasa players
I liga players
II liga players
III liga players